Launaea sarmentosa is a perennial herb species in the family Asteraceae. It is native to coastal areas in Africa (east coast), Madagascar, the Seychelles, Mauritius, India, Sri Lanka, Maldives and Southeast Asia. It is naturalized in Western Australia.

Uses
Kulla-filaa (IAST Kuḷḷafilā, ކުއްޅަފިލާ in Maldivian) has been used as a dietary plant in the Maldives for centuries in dishes such as mas huni and also as a medicinal plant.

Bibliography
Yusriyya Salih, A Pharmacognostical and Pharmacological Evaluation of a Folklore Medicinal Plant "Kulhafila" (Launea sarmentosa (Willd) Schultz-Bip.ex Kuntze). Gujarat Ayurved University – 2011
Xavier Romero-Frias, Eating on the Islands, Himāl Southasian, Vol. 26 no. 2, pages 69–91

References

External links

sarmentosa
Flora of Egypt
Flora of the Indian subcontinent
Flora of the Western Indian Ocean
Flora of Mozambique
Flora of South Africa
Flora of Vietnam